The Liberal Party, also known as the Liberal Union or the Liberal Union Party, was a short-lived political party in Australia (mainly Victoria and South Australia) that operated mainly in 1922. The party was formed by disaffected Nationalists, principally Thomas Ashworth and Charles Merrett, who opposed the leadership of Prime Minister Billy Hughes. Two federal Nationalist MPs, Victorian William Watt and South Australian Richard Foster, joined the Liberal Party and three more MPs (John Latham from Victoria, and Malcolm Cameron and Jack Duncan-Hughes from South Australia) were elected in the 1922 federal election. South Australian Nationalist Senators James Rowell and Edward Vardon also contested the election, unsuccessfully, as Liberals. Their opposition to Hughes, coupled with the hostility of the Country Party to supporting a Hughes-led government, was a factor in Hughes' decision to resign the prime ministership in favour of Stanley Bruce. After Hughes' removal, all five Liberals rejoined the Nationalist Party, although they remained officially Liberals until 1925.

References

Defunct political parties in Australia
Liberal parties in Australia
Political parties with year of establishment missing
Political parties disestablished in 1925
1925 disestablishments in Australia